The 2000 Iraqi Perseverance Cup was the 5th edition of the Iraqi Super Cup. The match was contested between Baghdad rivals Al-Zawraa and Al-Quwa Al-Jawiya at Al-Shaab Stadium in Baghdad. It was played on 22 December 2000 as a curtain-raiser to the 2000–01 season. Al-Zawraa retained their title, winning the match 1–0.

Match

Details

References

External links
 Iraq Football Association

Football competitions in Iraq
2000–01 in Iraqi football
Iraqi Super Cup